Patashpur Assembly constituency is an assembly constituency in Purba Medinipur district in the Indian state of West Bengal.

Overview
As per orders of the Delimitation Commission, No. 212 Patashpur Assembly constituency is composed of the following: Patashpur I community development block; Khargram, Panchet, Pataspur, South Khanda and Sreerampur gram panchayats of Patashpur II community development block.

Patashpur Assembly constituency is part of No. 31 Kanthi (Lok Sabha constituency). It was earlier part of Midnapore (Lok Sabha constituency).

Members of Legislative Assembly

Election results

2021

2016

2011

  

.# Swing calculated on Congress+Trinamool Congress vote percentages taken together in 2006.

1977-2006
Kamakhya Nandan Das Mohapatra of CPI won the Patashpur assembly seat six times in a row, defeating Tapan Kanti Kar of Trinamool Congress in 2006, Mrinal Kanti Das of Trinamool Congress in 2001, Paresh Chandra Bhunia of Congress in 1996, Sunil Pal of Congress in 1991, Pradyot Kumar Mahanti of Congress in 1987 and Radha Nath Das Adhikary of Congress in 1982. Contests in most years were multi cornered but only winners and runners are being mentioned. Janmejoy Ojha of Janata Party defeated Barendra Nath Patra of Congress in 1977.

1951-1972
Prafulla Maity of Congress won in 1972 and 1971. K.D.Mahapatra (Kamakhya Nandan Das Mahapatra) of CPI won in 1969 and 1967. Radhanath Das Adhikari of Congress won in 1962. Sisir Kumar Das of PSP won in 1957. In independent India's first election in 1951 Janardan Sahu of BJS won the Pataspur assembly seat.

References

Assembly constituencies of West Bengal
Politics of Purba Medinipur district